The Burnett River is a river located in the Wide Bay–Burnett and Central Queensland regions of Queensland, Australia.

Course and features

The Burnett River rises in the Burnett Range, part of the Great Dividing Range, close to Mount Gaeta and east of Monto. It drains a basin covering 33,210 km² which is 1.9% of the total area of Queensland.

The river flows generally south past Eidsvold and Mundubbera before heading east, adjacent to the townships of Gayndah and Wallaville before entering the city of Bundaberg. The river descends  over its  course.

The Burnett River region is largely given over to growing sugar cane and small crops. The river is part of the Brigalow Belt and South East Queensland bioregions.

Major tributaries

Three Moon Creek
Three Moon Creek rises near Kroombit Tops National Park north of Monto and flows south through Monto and Mulgildie, is dammed near Cania Gorge to form Lake Cania, before emptying into the Burnett River south-east of Abercorn.

Nogo River
The Nogo River rises in the hills north-west of Monto, is dammed west of Abercorn to form Wuruma Lake, and flows south-east to join the Burnett near Ceratodus.

Auburn River

Boyne River
The Boyne River rises in the Bunya Mountains National Park south-west of Kingaroy and flows in a general northerly direction, is dammed near Proston to form Lake Boondooma, emptying into the Burnett River near Mundubbera, only  from the Burnett River-Auburn River confluence.

Barambah Creek
Barambah Creek rises in the hills between Kingaroy and the Sunshine Coast, north of Jimna and flows in a general northerly direction, it flows just below the dam wall of Lake Barambah, also known as Bjelke-Petersen Dam, before meeting the Burnett River north-east of Gayndah near Ban Ban Springs.

History

Prehistory

The Burnett River area was historically inhabited by the Taribelang Aboriginal tribe.

European exploration
The river is named after James Charles Burnett, the first European explorer to visit the river in 1847.

Dam construction
Named after the old gold mining township of Paradise, which is now submerged under the waters of the reservoir, all of the structures and artefacts found at the site were transferred to the nearby town of Biggenden. The design of the dam complies with environmental guidelines and includes a fish ladder that allows fish such as the Queensland lungfish to travel upstream as well as downstream from the dam wall.

Fish
The Burnett River, together with the nearby Mary River, is home to the Queensland lungfish, one of the most ancient of the extant vertebrate species.

See also

Auburn River Dam

References

External links

Map of Burnett and its tributaries from the Bureau of Meteorology Australia
Burnett Water Pty. Ltd.

Rivers of Queensland
Bundaberg
Central Queensland
Wide Bay–Burnett